Philippe Garrel (born 6 April 1948) is a French director, cinematographer, screenwriter, film editor, and producer, associated with the French New Wave movement. His films have won him awards at Cannes Film Festival , Venice Film Festival, and Berlin Film Festival.

Early life
Philippe Garrel was born in Boulogne-Billancourt in 1948, the son of actor Maurice Garrel and his wife. His brother, Thierry Garrel, is a producer.

The younger Garrel became interested in film and started his career early, influenced by the new work of Jean-Luc Godard and François Truffaut. At the age of 16, Garrel wrote and directed his first film, Les Enfants désaccordés, in 1964.

Awards
In 1982, Garrel won the Prix Jean Vigo for the film L'Enfant secret. He won Perspectives du Cinéma Award at the Cannes Film Festival in 1984 for his 1983 film Liberté, la nuit.
Over a ten-year period, Garrel enjoyed a good run of critical recognition at the Venice Film Festival. In 1991, he won a Silver Lion for his film J'entends plus la guitare, which was nominated for a Golden Lion. Le Vent de la nuit was nominated for a Golden Lion in 1999. Two years later, Sauvage Innocence was nominated for a Golden Lion and won the FIPRESCI Prize.  His 2005 film, Les Amants réguliers, won him the Silver Lion, for Best Director.

Personal life
Garrel met German singer and actress Nico in 1969 when she performed the song "The Falconer" for his film Le Lit de la Vierge (The Virgin's Bed). The couple soon started living together. He first cast Nico in his 1972 film La Cicatrice intérieure (aka The Inner Scar). Songs from the soundtrack were included in Nico's album Desertshore, which featured stills from the film on the front and back covers. Nico was featured in a number of Garrel's films after this. Their ten-year relationship ended in 1979.

Garrel and actress Brigitte Sy are the parents of actors Louis Garrel and Esther Garrel.

He is married to actress-writer Caroline Deruas.

Filmography

References

Sources
 "Philippe Garrel", Senses Of Cinema website 
 "Philippe Garrel", Strictly Film School 
 "Philippe Garrel", New York Times movie entry 
 Interview

External links
 
  Sight & Sound career overview by Cristina Alvarez López and Adrian Martin

1948 births
Living people
People from Boulogne-Billancourt
French film directors
Silver Bear for Best Director recipients
Venice Best Director Silver Lion winners
European Film Awards winners (people)
Best Director Lumières Award winners
French male screenwriters
French screenwriters
French film producers
French film editors
French cinematographers
French male non-fiction writers